Dame Glenys Jean Stacey DBE (née McBride; born 1954) is a solicitor and civil servant serving as chair of the Office for Environmental Protection from February 2021. She was Chief Executive and Chief Regulator of Ofqual, acting in the post from August to December 2020, and previously from 2012 to 2016. Stacey also served as Her Majesty's Chief Inspector of Probation and led HM Inspectorate of Probation for England and Wales from 2016 and 2019.

She has worked in the public sector at senior management level since 2000. Previously she has worked as chief executive of Ofqual, of Standards for England, at Animal Health (now part of the Animal and Plant Health Agency), at the Greater Manchester Magistrates' Courts Committee (now part of HM Courts and Tribunals Service), and at the Criminal Cases Review Commission.

She was appointed Dame Commander of the Order of the British Empire (DBE) in the 2016 New Year Honours for services to education.

Stacey returned as Ofqual's chief regulator in an interim capacity on 26 August 2020 following the resignation of Sally Collier in connection with the 2020 UK GCSE and A-Level grading controversy.

References

Living people
1950s births
Place of birth missing (living people)
Dames Commander of the Order of the British Empire
British solicitors
British chief executives
Alumni of the University of Kent